Trebas Institute is a for-profit private Canadian, bilingual, post-secondary college that offers music, film, business, technology and management programs, with campuses in Montreal, Quebec, and Toronto, Ontario.

History  
Trebas Institute, also known as Institut Trebas, was founded in 1979 by David P. Leonard.

In May 2020, Trebas was acquired by Netherlands-headquartered private education company Global University Systems.

Trebas was voted as one of the best institutions "where to train as an artist" at the Toronto Star 2020 Readers’ Choice Awards in October 2020.

As of January 2021, only international graduates from select programs offered at Trebas Institute’s Quebec campus in Montreal are eligible to receive a Canadian post-graduate work permit (PGWP). The institution’s programs at the Ontario campus in Toronto are not PGWP-eligible.

Alumni 
Notable Trebas alumni include Grammy Award-winning music producer, Mike Piersante; music producer, Jeremy Harding (from Sean Paul's 2009 album, Imperial Blaze); Megadeth singer and guitarist, Dave Mustaine; and singer, songwriter and producer from France, Dominique de Witte.

References

External links 

Film schools in Canada
Cinema of Quebec
Universities and colleges in Montreal
Universities and colleges in Toronto
Educational institutions established in 1979
1979 establishments in Quebec
Private universities and colleges in Canada
Music schools in Canada